The chestnut white-bellied rat (Niviventer fulvescens) is a species of rodent in the family Muridae.
It is a small rodent with a distinct bright chestnut upper-coat and a white under-coat. The colour of the upper-coat is variable from very bright to a duller brown. The side of the body has a distinct margin where the upper and the under-coat meet. The upper-side of the tail is mostly brownish whereas the underside is whitish to flesh coloured. The species is mostly found in disturbed and undisturbed forest habitat. The species is known to scatter-hoard seeds in forests of eastern Himalayas.

It is found in Bangladesh, Cambodia, China, India, Indonesia, Laos, Malaysia, Nepal, Pakistan, Thailand, and Vietnam.

References

 Musser, G., Lunde, D., Aplin, K. & Molur, S.2008.  Niviventer fulvescens.   2008 IUCN Red List of Threatened Species.   Downloaded on 9 June 2009.

Rats of Asia
Niviventer
Rodents of Bangladesh
Rodents of India
Rodents of Pakistan
Mammals of Nepal
Rodents of Myanmar
Rodents of Laos
Rodents of Vietnam
Rodents of Cambodia
Rodents of Thailand
Rodents of Indonesia
Rodents of Malaysia
Rodents of China
Mammals described in 1847
Taxonomy articles created by Polbot